Inside the Actors Studio is an American talk show that airs on Ovation. The series premiered in 1994 on Bravo where it aired for 22 seasons and was hosted by James Lipton from its premiere until 2018. It is taped at the Michael Schimmel Center for the Arts at Pace University's New York City campus.

On April 2, 2019, it was announced that the show would move to Ovation with the 23rd season premiering on October 13, 2019. Along with producing a new season, Ovation acquired the rights to all previous seasons. With the new format, the show now uses a rotating panel of hosts.

About the program

The program began as a televised craft seminar for students of the Actors Studio Drama School, originally a joint venture of the Actors Studio and New School University in 1994, with Paul Newman, a former Actors Studio president, as its first guest, and soon became Bravo's flagship program. At first taped at the New School's Tishman Auditorium in Greenwich Village, New York City, it was shifted subsequently to its present location, Michael Schimmel Center for the Arts at Pace University's New York City campus. The program is presented as a seminar to students of the Actors Studio Drama School at Pace University.

The show deliberately uses a slower pace in the interviews as compared with a typical celebrity interview, thus cameras usually record a couple of hours of conversation, later edited to one or two hours. The result, as a New York Times article expressed it, "In Mr. Lipton's guest chair, actors cease being stars for a while and become artists and teachers." Though sometimes, some interviews go longer; Steven Spielberg's 1999 visit, for example, stretched to four hours, and was later shown as two episodes of one hour each. The interviews are guided by Lipton's trademark index-card questions, which sometimes reveal his well-researched knowledge of guests' lives, often startling some. On one such occasion, Billy Crystal told Lipton, "You know you're scary, don't you?" On another occasion, Martin Sheen asked Lipton, "How do you know all this? This is extraordinary." And Sir Anthony Hopkins, upon learning that Lipton knew the exact address where the former had been born and raised in Wales, turned to the audience and remarked, "He's a detective, you know."

In May 2005, the contract between the Actors Studio and New School University was not renewed. Beginning with the 12th season, in the fall of 2005, the program was taped at the Michael Schimmel Center for the Arts at Pace University's New York City campus. The show featured a new set with a gritty backstage feel, designed by Will Rothfuss for Blair Broadcast Designs, and The Actors Studio Drama School at Pace University re-opened in new facilities.

Since its premiere, Inside the Actors Studio has had over 300 guests. The first episode's guest was Paul Newman (Alec Baldwin was the first guest, but his interview was broadcast after Newman's). The guests have included 74 Academy Award winners: eight directors; four screenwriters; 61 actors and actresses; and three composers. For its 200th show, Lipton became the guest subject of the show. He was questioned by Dave Chappelle, whom he picked personally. The show ended with the Pace University provost announcing that the college is sponsoring a scholarship in Chappelle's name to his high school alma mater. Based on the show, James Lipton published a book titled Inside Inside in 2007. In September 2018, Lipton declared that he was stepping down from the program after 23 seasons. Starting in 2019, the show is hosted by different celebrities.

In his review of the program, The Sunday Times critic A.A. Gill wrote: "The format is simple and idiotically inspired. The Actors Studio is the New York drama school made famous by Stanislavsky and his method (although the series is now filmed elsewhere). These shows are thinly set-up masterclasses for students. The cleverness is in the vanity it allows the guests, who are the very greatest and most self-regarding performers and creators of theatre and film. People who are too grand to talk to anyone will talk to Inside the Actors Studio. They believe they're giving something back, offering precious pearls of insight to a new generation. And who doesn't look good passing it on to adoring students? In truth, it's just a chat show on satellite, but the veil of education and posterity is held decorously high, so everybody turns up and talks with a smile."

While most of the show is a one-on-one interview conducted by the host (Lipton in the first 22 seasons, rotating hosts since season 23), this is followed by the host submitting a questionnaire to the guest. The questionnaire concept was originated by French television personality Bernard Pivot on his show Apostrophes, after the Proust Questionnaire. The 10 questions Lipton asks are:

What is your favorite word?
What is your least favorite word?
What turns you on?
What turns you off?
What sound or noise do you love?
What sound or noise do you hate?
What is your favorite curse word?
What profession other than your own would you like to attempt?
What profession would you not like to do?
If heaven exists, what would you like to hear God say when you arrive at the pearly gates?

The program usually concludes with a question-and-answer session with the students.

In France, the show has been broadcast since 1999 on Paris Première, with French subtitles.

In popular culture
The show has been good-naturedly lampooned for Lipton's paused and somewhat clipped delivery on Saturday Night Live, in which Will Ferrell portrayed Lipton interviewing himself as an annoyed guest. He was also spoofed on The Simpsons, where character Rainier Wolfcastle (a parody of Arnold Schwarzenegger) shoots his interviewer and a dying Lipton croaks, "It's a pleasure to eat your lead, good sir." In another episode of The Simpsons, in which Homer donates a kidney, he single-mindedly rushes his family home so he can watch the Inside The Actors Studio interview of F. Murray Abraham. Ferrell, with his Old School co-stars Vince Vaughn, Luke Wilson and director Todd Phillips, again portrayed a satirical version of Lipton in a skit called "Inside the Actors Studio Spoof", which can be seen as part of the DVD release special features for the film. Ferrell appears as himself and answers questions poking fun at some of his less successful films, such as A Night at the Roxbury, in what is obviously a comedic take on Lipton's reverential approach to his interviewees. Comedian Will Sasso portrayed Lipton on Mad TV and David Cross parodied him as Cyrus on Mr Show. Weird Al Yankovic's song "Couch Potato" describes "James Lipton discussing the oeuvre of Mr. Rob Schneider." among other things on TV. In the Mystery Science Theater 3000 episode "Werewolf," Mike Nelson hits his head and thinks he is James Lipton.

Guests

Guest list for the show sorted alphabetically by last name. For a full list, see List of Inside the Actors Studio episodes.

A
 Amy Adams
 Ben Affleck
 Alan Alda
 Tim Allen
 Jennifer Aniston
 Judd Apatow
 Will Arnett
 Hank Azaria

B
 Lauren Bacall
 Alec Baldwin (twice)
 Antonio Banderas
 Ellen Barkin
 Roseanne Barr
 Drew Barrymore
 Kim Basinger
 Jason Bateman
 Kathy Bates
 Ned Beatty
 Halle Berry
 Juliette Binoche
 Jack Black
 Cate Blanchett
 Jon Bon Jovi
 Alex Borstein
 Julie Bowen
 Peter Boyle
 Jeff Bridges
 Matthew Broderick
 Josh Brolin
 Pierce Brosnan
 David Bryan
 Carol Burnett
 Ty Burrell
 Ellen Burstyn
 Gabriel Byrne

C
 James Caan
 Nicolas Cage
 Michael Caine
 James Cameron
 Steve Carell
 George Carlin
 Jim Carrey
 Dan Castellaneta
 Nancy Cartwright
 Stockard Channing
 Dave Chappelle (only artist to appear 3 times - 2005, 2008, 2013)
 Jessica Chastain
 Don Cheadle
 George Clooney
 Lauren Cohan 
 Glenn Close
 Chris Colfer
 Jennifer Connelly
 Bradley Cooper (twice) 
 Francis Ford Coppola
 Kevin Costner
 Bryan Cranston
 Russell Crowe
 Tom Cruise
 Billy Crystal (twice)
 John Cusack

D
 Willem Dafoe (twice)
 Matt Damon
 Jeff Daniels
 Ted Danson
 Geena Davis
 Viola Davis
 Benicio del Toro
 Robert De Niro
 Bruce Dern
 Laura Dern (twice)
 Johnny Depp
 Danny DeVito
 Cameron Diaz
 Matt Dillon
 Stanley Donen
 Michael Douglas
 Robert Downey Jr.
 Richard Dreyfuss
 David Duchovny
 Olympia Dukakis
 Faye Dunaway
 Lena Dunham
 Robert Duvall

E
 Clint Eastwood

F
 Peter Falk
 Jesse Tyler Ferguson
 Tina Fey
 Sally Field
 Ralph Fiennes
 Colin Firth
 Laurence Fishburne
 Jane Fonda
 Harrison Ford
 Jodie Foster
 Michael J. Fox (with Tracy Pollan)
 Jamie Foxx
 James Franco
 Morgan Freeman

G
 James Gandolfini
 Andy García
 Danai Gurira
 Brad Garrett
 Richard Gere
 Ricky Gervais
 Danny Glover
 William Goldman
 Whoopi Goldberg
 Cuba Gooding Jr.
 John Goodman
 Hugh Grant
 Lee Grant
 Seth Green
 Melanie Griffith
 Jake Gyllenhaal

H
 Gene Hackman
 Jon Hamm
 Tom Hanks (twice)
 Alyson Hannigan
 Mariska Hargitay
 Ed Harris
 Jared Harris
 Neil Patrick Harris (twice)
 Teri Hatcher
 Ethan Hawke
 Goldie Hawn
 Salma Hayek
 Sean Hayes
 Patricia Heaton
 Christina Hendricks
 Mike Henry
 Dustin Hoffman
 Philip Seymour Hoffman
 Anthony Hopkins (twice)
 Dennis Hopper
 Ron Howard
 Kate Hudson
 Helen Hunt
 Holly Hunter
 John Hurt
 Mitchell Hurwitz
 Anjelica Huston

I
 Jeremy Irons

J
 Hugh Jackman (twice)
 Anne Jackson (with Eli Wallach)
 Samuel L. Jackson
 Allison Janney
 Norman Jewison
 Billy Joel
 Scarlett Johansson
 Elton John
 Angelina Jolie
 January Jones
 Tommy Lee Jones

K
 Vincent Kartheiser
 Julie Kavner
 Harvey Keitel
 Val Kilmer 
 Ben Kingsley
 Jemima Kirke
 Kevin Kline

L
 Martin Landau
 Diane Lane
 Nathan Lane
 Jessica Lange
 Anthony LaPaglia
 Queen Latifah
 Hugh Laurie
 Jude Law
 Martin Lawrence
 Denis Leary
 Spike Lee
 Jennifer Jason Leigh
 Jack Lemmon
 Jay Leno
 Jerry Lewis
 Laura Linney
 James Lipton
 Jennifer Lopez
 Julia Louis-Dreyfus
 Sidney Lumet
 Jane Lynch

M
 Seth MacFarlane
 Shirley MacLaine
 William H. Macy
 Zosia Mamet
 Leslie Mann
 Mary Stuart Masterson
 Matthew McConaughey
 Eric McCormack
 Ian McKellen
 Chris Meloni
 S. Epatha Merkerson
 Debra Messing
 Lea Michele
 Bette Midler
 Arthur Miller
 Liza Minnelli
 Mo'Nique
 Cory Monteith
 Julianne Moore
 Mary Tyler Moore
 Jeanne Moreau
 Matthew Morrison
 Megan Mullally
 Eddie Murphy
 Ryan Murphy
 Mike Myers (twice)

N
 Liam Neeson
 Paul Newman
 Mike Nichols
 Chris Noth
 Edward Norton

O
 Conan O'Brien
 Rosie O'Donnell
 Ed O'Neill
 David Oyelowo

P
 Al Pacino (twice)
 Gwyneth Paltrow
 Sarah Jessica Parker (twice)
 Estelle Parsons 
 Jim Parsons
 Arthur Penn
 Sean Penn
 Bernadette Peters
 Michelle Pfeiffer
 Brad Pitt
 Amy Poehler
 Sydney Pollack
 Tracy Pollan (with Michael J. Fox)
 Natalie Portman

Q
 Dennis Quaid
 Anthony Quinn

R
 Daniel Radcliffe
 Josh Radnor
 Robert Redford
 Vanessa Redgrave
 Norman Reedus
 Christopher Reeve
 Burt Reynolds
 Tim Robbins
 Doris Roberts
 Julia Roberts
 Chris Rock
 Ray Romano
 Diana Ross
 Portia de Rossi
 Mickey Rourke
 Mark Ruffalo
 Meg Ryan
 Mark Rydell

S
 Richie Sambora
 Susan Sarandon
 Robert Schneider
 Martin Scorsese
 Kyra Sedgwick
 Jason Segel
 Alia Shawkat
 Harry Shearer
 Charlie Sheen
 Martin Sheen
 Brooke Shields
 Kiernan Shipka
 Martin Short
 Sarah Silverman
 Neil Simon
 Gary Sinise
 Christian Slater
 John Slattery
 Yeardley Smith
 Will Smith
 Cobie Smulders
 Stephen Sondheim
 Sissy Spacek
 Kevin Spacey
 Steven Spielberg
 Sylvester Stallone
 Ben Stiller
 Sharon Stone
 Eric Stonestreet
 Susan Stroman 
 Meryl Streep
 Barbra Streisand
 Donald Sutherland
 Kiefer Sutherland
 Hilary Swank

T
 Jeffrey Tambor
 Tico Torres
 Charlize Theron
 Billy Bob Thornton
 John Travolta

V
 Sofía Vergara

W
 Mark Wahlberg
 Christopher Walken
 Eli Wallach (with Anne Jackson)
 Jessica Walter
 Barbara Walters
 Naomi Watts
 Sigourney Weaver
 Matthew Weiner
 Kristen Wiig
 Forest Whitaker
 Betty White
 Gene Wilder
 Allison Williams
 Robin Williams
 Bruce Willis
 Debra Winger
 Henry Winkler
 Kate Winslet
 Shelley Winters
 Dick Wolf
 Alfre Woodard
 James Woods
 Joanne Woodward

Y
 Steven Yeun

Z
 Renée Zellweger

Cast notes

Ensemble guests
 Cast of Everybody Loves Raymond: Ray Romano, Patricia Heaton, Brad Garrett, Doris Roberts, and Peter Boyle
 Cast of Family Guy: Seth MacFarlane, Alex Borstein, Seth Green and Mike Henry
 Mila Kunis, who plays Meg Griffin, had a schedule conflict and was unavailable.
 Casts of Law & Order: creator Dick Wolf, Chris Noth (Law & Order; Law & Order: Criminal Intent), S. Epatha Merkerson (Law & Order)
 Christopher Meloni (Law & Order: Special Victims Unit) had to leave before his interview during the taping because of an illness he had that day, he was edited out of the introduction since he was not able to be interviewed during the show.
 Cast of The Producers musical: director Susan Stroman, Nathan Lane, Matthew Broderick
 Cast of The Simpsons: Dan Castellaneta, Julie Kavner, Nancy Cartwright, Yeardley Smith, Hank Azaria, and Harry Shearer
 Kavner left in the middle of the show without an on-air explanation, leaving an empty chair for much of the show, until it was removed during a commercial break. When James Lipton appeared on The Simpsons Season 13 DVD Audio Commentary (Episode "The Sweetest Apu"), he explained that Kavner was scheduled to go to Shelter Island on Long Island on an 11:15pm ferry, so she had to leave. Although Kavner is known for not approving of doing her Marge Simpson voice in person, she did perform the voice (as well as that of Patty and Selma Bouvier) while hiding her face behind a cardboard cutout of Marge's face although the final broadcast showed clips of the character as well as the characters portrayed by the other actors while they did their voices.
 Cast of Will & Grace: Debra Messing, Eric McCormack, Sean Hayes, and Megan Mullally
 Members of Bon Jovi: Jon Bon Jovi, Richie Sambora, David Bryan and Tico Torres
 Cast of Modern Family: Ed O'Neill, Sofia Vergara, Julie Bowen, Ty Burrell, Jesse Tyler Ferguson, and Eric Stonestreet
Cast of Glee: Lea Michele, Cory Monteith, Chris Colfer, Jane Lynch, Matthew Morrison, and creator Ryan Murphy
Cast of Mad Men: Jon Hamm, January Jones, Vincent Kartheiser, Christina Hendricks, Kiernan Shipka, John Slattery, Jared Harris, and Matthew Weiner
Cast of Arrested Development: Mitchell Hurwitz, Jason Bateman, Portia de Rossi, Will Arnett, Alia Shawkat, Jeffrey Tambor, and Jessica Walter
Cast of How I Met Your Mother: Josh Radnor, Jason Segel, Cobie Smulders, Neil Patrick Harris, and Alyson Hannigan.
Cast of The Walking Dead: Lauren Cohan, Danai Gurira, Norman Reedus, and Steven Yeun.
Cast of Girls: Lena Dunham, Jemima Kirke, Zosia Mamet, and Allison Williams.

Declined invitations
 In January 2013, Jennifer Lawrence declined the chance to appear on the show, citing her youth and lack of experience.
 From the show's beginnings, Lipton had tried to persuade Marlon Brando to come on the show. Although a charter member of the Actors Studio, Brando flatly refused; speaking in a 2012 interview, it was the only such categorical rejection Lipton could recall:
[B]y the time I started the show -- although he was a member of the Actor's Studio and had been trained by Stella Adler as I was; we knew each other, and we used to talk on the phone for hours at a time -- but by that time he was already reclusive. I couldn't get him out of the house and neither could anyone else.

Home media
Selected episodes of the show have been released by Shout! Factory.  Three DVDs containing a single episode each feature Robin Williams, Johnny Depp, Dave Chappelle and Barbra Streisand.  Two compilation sets were also released.  Leading Men features Robert De Niro, Al Pacino, Sean Penn, and Russell Crowe.  Icons features Clint Eastwood, Paul Newman, Robert Redford, and Barbra Streisand.

Awards 
The show has been nominated for 18 Emmy awards, winning once.

References

Further reading
Inside Inside, by James Lipton. Pub. Dutton, 2007. .
 Inside the Actors Studio. Pub. Shout Factory, 2008. .

External links

Actor Guests List

1994 American television series debuts
1990s American television talk shows
2000s American television talk shows
2010s American television talk shows
English-language television shows
Television shows filmed in New York City
Bravo (American TV network) original programming
Actors Studio